The Koenigsegg CCR is a mid-engine sports car manufactured by Koenigsegg and the successor to the company's previous offering, the CC8S.

Overview
Debuting at the March 2004 Geneva Auto Show, the CCR was the most powerful version of the Koenigsegg CC range cars at the time. Like the CC8S it features dihedral synchro-helix actuation doors. It has, however, various improvements. A larger front splitter for optimized downforce and tweaked headlight arrangement came standard with a rear wing. New larger tires and wheels equipped with larger brakes.

To honour the Swedish Fighter Jet Squadron No 1 (Johan röd) which had occupied the current facility of Koenigsegg, the CCR is adorned with a symbol of a ghost, the symbol of the squadron.

Performance
 Displacement: 
 Acceleration: 0- in 3.2 seconds
 Top speed: ; theoretical top speed of over 
0-: 2.1 seconds
0-: 3.0 seconds
0-: 3.7 seconds
0-: 4.3 seconds
0-: 5.5 seconds
0-: 6.5 seconds
0-: 7.9 seconds
0-: 9.3 seconds
0-: 11.0 seconds
0-: 13.7 seconds
0-: 16.2 seconds
0-: 24.9 seconds
0- mile: 11.2 seconds @

Special/Tuned Editions

CCR REVO

Originally a sky blue CCR with a white and blue bi-colour interior, this CCR received major upgrades from the factory upon the owner's request in 2012 and was dubbed the Koenigsegg CCR Revo. It included numerous changes over the original car such as a clear coated carbon fibre body with candy red accents, red and black bi-colour interior with Koenigsegg Revo embroidered on the passenger side of the dashboard along with a fire extinguisher and an updated steering wheel, CCX rear diffuser, side skirts, fog lights, front splitter and wheels along with the twin-deck F1 rear spoiler found on the CCXR. The car also received engine upgrades such as an updated engine management system and superchargers.

EDO Competition CCR Evolution

A German-based tuning company named EDO Competition highly modified a CCR in 2011. The said CCR was originally yellow but had already received upgrades from the factory such as Silver exterior paint and 11-spoke CCX wheels, front splitter and side skirts, as well as the Top Gear rear spoiler in 2008. The company's process with the CCR began with a modified ECU to boost power and a modified drive ratio to allow the vehicle to achieve its peak torque. The six speed gearbox was disassembled in its entirety and the plastic bushings were replaced with Uniball units resulting in the improved drive ratio. As for the exterior, the tuner offered a new set of wheels with a coat of charcoal paint and an updated front end with auxiliary lights. The interior of the Koenigsegg was then covered in Alcantara material and a redesigned center console was added to accommodate a new infotainment system with a reversing camera and a custom-made pouch for the immobilizer remote. The total cost for this customization kit was €40,000 or $56,428.

Speed record

See also 

 List of production cars by power output

References

External links

 Official CCR site

CCR
Rear mid-engine, rear-wheel-drive vehicles
Cars introduced in 2004